Sherin Taama (born May 26, 1982, in Alexandria) is an Egyptian rhythmic gymnast.

Taama competed for Egypt in the rhythmic gymnastics individual all-around competition at the 2000 Summer Olympics in Sydney. She placed 24th in the qualification round and did not advance to the final.

References

External links 
 Sherin Taama at Sports-Reference.com

1982 births
Living people
Egyptian rhythmic gymnasts
Gymnasts at the 2000 Summer Olympics
Olympic gymnasts of Egypt
Sportspeople from Alexandria
Competitors at the 2001 World Games